UTC−00:25:21 is an identifier for a time offset from UTC of −00:25:21, i.e. twenty-five minutes and twenty-one seconds behind Greenwich Mean Time. This time was used in Ireland between 1880 and 1916.

History
UTC −00:25:21, the time offset of Dunsink Observatory near Dublin, was used in Ireland as Dublin Mean Time.

Dublin Mean Time was introduced by the Statutes (Definition of Time) Act, 1880, which also defined Greenwich Mean Time (GMT) as legal time in Great Britain. This Act replaced local mean time, which had been held to be the legal time since Curtis v. March in 1858, throughout the United Kingdom of Great Britain and Ireland.

From 3:00 am Dublin Summer Time on Sunday 1 October 1916, the Time (Ireland) Act, 1916 changed the time used in Ireland to be the same as that used in Great Britain, both during daylight saving time and at other times.

References

External links
Dunsink and Timekeeping
History of legal time in Britain

UTC offsets
Time in Ireland
Time in the Republic of Ireland